The Lingnan School of painting, also called the Cantonese School, is a style of painting from the Guangdong or Lingnan region of China.

This school reflects a style of painting founded in the 19th century in Guangdong province by Two Gaos and one Chen - Gao Jianfu, Gao Qifeng and Chen Shuren, also known as "The three greats of Lingnan".

The Lingnan style of painting was revolutionary and innovative compared to traditional Chinese painting, influenced by Nihonga visual arts and by the early Qing painter, Yun Shouping (1633–1690).

In the late 19th century, scholars in China broke through entrenched conservative thoughts and began to actively seek to create and promote new schools and styles of art. This not only cultivated a large amount of ideological progress among social elites but also gave birth to the "eclectic fusion of the Han Chinese and Western style, ancient and modern" Lingnan school. The Lingnan school advocates the introduction of Western painting styles with the integration of Han Chinese and Western paintings, in the spirit of revolution of Oriental arts, while maintaining traditional Han Chinese painting techniques.

This school of painting enjoys considerable fame among Han Chinese peoples. Along with Cantonese opera and Cantonese music, they are known as the "three fineries of Lingnan" (Jyutping: Ling5 Naam4 Saam1 Sau3; Traditional Chinese: 嶺南三秀). Meanwhile, the Lingnan school is listed along with Beijing and Tianjin painting school and Shanghai school as the three pillars of modern Chinese painting.

Name
The term "Lingnan School" was not coined by Lingnan painters. During their era, Gao Jianfu, Gao Qifeng and Chen Shuren, with their bold and innovative style, were given the title of "The Three Greats of Lingnan." This contributed to the formation of the name "Lingnan school". However, Chan expressed his dissatisfaction with the title "Lingnan school" as he felt that it suggested that the school was merely regional and that it did not reflect the absorption of overseas styles and the idealism of innovation in Han Chinese paintings. Gao Jianfu never used the name "Lingnan school of painting," and would rather call it "eclectic."

"Lingnan painting" refers to the work of painters in the Guangdong province in general.

Techniques  
According to Wang Lipu's view, Lingnan school is characterized by:
Blank space focus: Lingnan paintings, in line with traditional Han Chinese painting styles, are focused on the "presence of both the real and the surreal", and "paying attention to the places without ink" - inheriting the traditional techniques of ink wash paintings.
Strokes focus: Lingnan school's strokes are complex and anti-tradition, with the goal of achieving magnificence and vividness.   
Bright coloring: Influenced by impressionism, Lingnan paintings focus on the light performance. Most of the colors are very bright, in stark contrast to the traditional ink wash painting, which in turn is pale, stressing "With paleness comes the soul of pens and ink". 
Rendering of background colors: Since the Tang dynasty poet-artist Wang Wei put forward the idea that ink wash was superior, In general, Han Chinese painting styles focus on the use of ink wash and abstain from coloring. Lingnan school does the opposite.

Notable artists
Chao Shao-an (Zhao Shao'ang)
Guan Shanyue
He Xiangning
Huang Junbi
Li Jinkun
Li Xiongcai
Liu Chuncao
Yang Shan Shen
Au Ho-nien
Ho Fung-lin
Hsin Peng Chiu
Anita Yan Wong

Gallery

See also
Cantonese culture
Culture of Hong Kong

References

External links
岭南画派：岭南派画家陈蕴化建立的介绍岭南画派的网站 (in Mandarin Chinese)  
The Lingnan School of Painting - Introduction  
In Search of Inspiration

Lingnan school of painting
Art movements in Chinese painting